Ouray  is an unincorporated village of the Uintah and Ouray Indian Reservation, located in west‑central Uintah County, Utah, United States.

Description
(The confluence of the Green and White rivers is approximately  further south.)

The community is the second oldest modern settlement within the Uinta Basin and was named in honor of Chief Ouray, a Native American chief of the Uncompahgre band of the Ute tribe. In the Ute language, "Ouray" means arrow.

History
The area was first settled by Europeans in the early 1830s when a trading post was established by French fur trader, Antoine Robidoux. The trading post was also known as Antoine Robidoux' Fort. Although he moved the trading post further north within a few years, the settlement remained in use and became known as Fort Kit Carson. (Some of the remains of structures from this earlier settlement still exist.)

Decades later, in 1881, an Indian agency for the Uncompahgre band of the Utes was established and included a post office for the area. At that time the settlement received its current name of Ouray. In response to the Meeker Massacre in Colorado in 1879, Fort Thornburgh was built in the area in 1886, but was moved to near the present day Vernal less than a year later. (However, the "new" Fort Thornburgh was abandoned several years after that when it was replaced by Fort Duchesne at the present site of Fort Duchesne.)

Even with the abandonment of the forts in the area, the community still prospered. However, by the late 1920s the population began to slowly decline. By December 1964, the post office finally closed.

Climate
Ouray has a cold semi-arid climate (BSk) with short but cold winters and long, hot summers. Precipitation is sparse year round.

See also

References

External links

 Ouray on ghosttowns.com

Unincorporated communities in Uintah County, Utah
Unincorporated communities in Utah